Seeing Double is an American silent comedy film.

Release
Seeing Double was released on April 19, 1913, in the United States, where it was released as a split-reel presentation with the documentary subject Jean and Her Family. It was released in London August 11, 1913.

References

External links
 

1913 films
1913 comedy films
Silent American comedy films
American black-and-white films
American silent short films
Films directed by Wilfrid North
1910s American films